Kabud Gonbad (also Romanized as Kabūd Gonbad) is a village in Jamalabad Rural District, Sharifabad District, Pakdasht County, Tehran Province, Iran. At the 2006 census, its population was 738, in 168 families.

References 

Populated places in Pakdasht County